Shrimaan Shrimati  (Translation : Mr. {and} Mrs.) is an Indian Hindi-language sitcom that aired on Doordarshan from 1994 to 1997. It starred Jatin Kanakia, Rakesh Bedi, Reema Lagoo and Archana Puran Singh. The show was created by Ashok Patole, directed by Rajan Waghdhare and produced by Gautam Adhikari and Markand Adhikari (popularly referred to as the "Adhikari brothers").

The show was dubbed in Tamil as Thiruvallar Thirumathi. In 1999 it was remade in Sinhalese as Nonawaruni Mahathwaruni, which was aired on Sirasa TV. In 2015, a show named Bhabhi Ji Ghar Par Hai! which is based on this show started airing on &TV. A reboot series titled Shrimaan Shrimati Phir Se premiered on SAB TV on 13 March 2018. On popular demand during national lockdown to prevent spread of coronavirus, Doordarshan re-telecast the series on DD National in month of April daily from 7.00 P.M. also on DD Bharti at 9:00 P.M. to 
10:00 P.M.back to back 2 episodes every day.

Plot
Shrimaan Shrimati was based on the premise of "love thy neighbor's wife". Keshav Kulkarni (Jatin Kanakia) is married to Kokila Kulkarni (Reema Lagoo). They are neighbors with popular film actress Prema Shalini (Archana Puran Singh) and her effeminate husband Dilruba Jarnail Singh Khurana (Rakesh Bedi).  Keshav is attracted to Prema's glamor and pretentious lifestyle, while Dilruba is attracted to Kokila who is a smart elegant housewife and unpretentious.  The husbands use every possible opportunity (and create many of their own) to seek the affections of the others' wives behind their own wives' backs.  Often their efforts come to naught.

The other important characters in the TV series are Keshav and Kokila's son Ajay 'Chintu' (Ajay Nagrath), another neighbor Ganga (Hema Diwan), Keshav's boss Dayashankar (sometimes Bablu Prasad) Sharma (Shail Chaturvedi).   Office co-worker Gokhale (Vijay Gokhale) is Keshav's frequent coconspirator---an aspiring actor, Gokhale often overdoes his performances in the many schemes he hatches for Keshav.

Cast and characters

Main
 Jatin Kanakia as Keshav Kulkarni a.k.a. Keshu, Pappu or Keku. He is the central character in the serial.  Keshav is dreadfully confrontational, remorselessly flirtatious and generally distrusting.  Generally, he is very disapproving of the actions of his wife, his son, his neighbor Dilruba, his manager at work, and with other office employees.  The only person Keshav seems to trust is his colleague and frequent co-conspirator, Gokhale.  Most of the show's plots center around Keshav's escapades and its hilarious upheavals.  Although he adores his wife and loves her, he is annoyingly faultfinding and taking dirty digs on her.  Keshav engages in flirtatious inoffensive behavior with his neighbor and film actor Prema Shalini, and craves her attention.  He is also frequently seen flirting with Prema Shalini's friend and guest Sapna, his boss's niece, and other women in his office.
 Reema Lagoo as Kokila Kulkarni a.k.a. Koki. She plays Keshav's  wife. She is a smart homemaker and whose admirer is Dilruba Jarnail Singh Khurana. She is an intelligent lady who is frustrated with her husband's crush on other ladies specially their neighbour Prema Shalini. 
 Archana Puran Singh as Prema Twins Shalini a.k.a. Doll or Prema ji. She plays a popular Bollywood film actress and speaks with an anglicised accent. Her name in the serial is a pun on real-life popular Bollywood actress Hema Malini.  Mostly, she relishes the amorous attention from Keshav Kulkarni, but occasionally resents his dropping by unannounced at her home.  Prema also contends with Keshav slipping into her film-making locations and interfering with the filmmakers.
 Rakesh Bedi as Dilruba Jarnail Singh Khurana a.k.a. Dilruba a.k.a. Dil. He plays Prema's submissive homemaker husband, and is rather effeminate by voice and body language. He has a huge crush on Koki
 Ajay Nagrath as Chintu, Keshav and Kokila's mischievous but adorable son. He has a tendency to deliberately and comically jumble up certain words. For instance, he addresses Dilruba as "Dil-bura uncle", which literally translated means "a person with ill will." Chintu always is seen to fail in his academics, and ends up getting it from Keshav most of the time.

Recurring
  Shail Chaturvedi as Mr. Bablu Prasad Sharma a.k.a. Mr. Sharma, is a director of a pharmaceutical company and Keshav & Gokhale's boss. He thinks of Keshav and gokhale as a useless and incompetent employee, and often refers to him as "luccha" (meaning "a cheat" in Hindi) or "bhikmanga Kulkarni" (meaning "beggar") and the most popular one, "3rd class aadmi". Keshav and gokhale thinks of him as a nuisance and calls him "taklu Sharma" behind his back (meaning "bald" in Hindi, as Mr. Sharma is semi-bald). 
 Hema Diwan as Ganga Mausi. She is a good friend of Koki and resides along with her husband Gangoba Tope (appeared only in one episode) in Gulmohar society. Ganga Mausi is the first person who provides any news or advice to Koki. Both Keshav and Chintu dislike Ganga Mausi. There is always an argument and verbal fight between Keshu and Ganga Mausi. She sometimes gives advices to Koki, which lead to a fight between Koki and Keshu. Dilruba calls her Ganges Mausi.
 Vijay Gokhale as Gokhale, Keshav's office colleague and best friend who helps Keshav in his schemes to impress women or in difficult situations but in some cases it backfires for both Keshav and Gokhale. He is best friend of Keshav and his most trustworthy person who always help Keshav to get out of trouble. Keshav and Gokhale's comedy timing and chemistry are highlights of the serial.
 Neena Gupta as Sapna. She had entered the cast of the series, when Archana Puran Singh (Prema Shalini) had taken a sabbatical for her pregnancy. It was shown that Prema Shalini had gone to Hollywood for playing a role in Filmmaker Evan Eelberg's (reference to Steven Spielberg) movie Children's Park (reference to Jurassic Park). Neena Gupta was a part of approximately 22-23 episodes and was shown to be married when Archana Puran Singh resumed shooting. The makers of the show had very tactfully managed the entry and exit of her character.
 IBM Laxmi Her real name is not known. She is one of the office staff in the series. She is a South Indian, who does her house hold work such as vegetable cutting, during office hours. She also gossips with her other colleagues such Ms. Joshi and Mr. Bombaywala.
Ms. Joshi. Her real name is not known. She is another office colleague of Keshav Kulkarni. She sits in the outer part of the office along with IBM Laxmi and Mr. Bombaywala. She always does make up while in office and gossips with her colleagues.
Mr. Bombaywala. His real name is not known. He another colleague of Mr. Keshav Kulkarni. He always keeps interrupting conversations of his office staff and gossips with them.
Baby Gazala Selmin as Pinky/Beggar child 
Sanchi Peswani as Soniya Verma a.k.a. Sonu/Sonu Baby - Sharma's Saali
Vinay Yedekar as Captain Pushpakamal(Episode 81)
Muni Jha as Koki's cousin/Dharmanand Nagar /Chaman who marries Sapna
Sharad Vyas as various characters
 Deven Bhojani as Old Chintu
 Kishore Nandlaskar as Gangoba Tope
 Jaywant Wadkar as Raju Chilka
Viju Khote as Sethia (Episode 17) Kala Kauwa (Episode 28)

Sequel and reboot
A sequel series Aaj Ke Shrimaan Shrimati based on same concept but with a new cast and characters aired on SAB TV in 2005.

&TV show Bhabiji Ghar Par Hain! is noted to have been inspired by Shrimaan Shrimati.

A reboot series Shrimaan Shrimati Phir Se premiered on SAB TV in 2018.

See also
 List of Hindi comedy shows
 List of programs broadcast by DD National

References

External links

Indian comedy television series
DD National original programming
Indian television sitcoms
1994 Indian television series debuts
1999 Indian television series endings